"Anaesthetist" is the second single taken from the album The Mindsweep by British band Enter Shikari. The song was first played on Zane Lowe's BBC Radio 1 show on 5 January 2015. An official video for the song directed by Mike Tyler was released on YouTube later the same day.

"Anaesthetist" received the Kerrang! Award for Best Single.

Subject matter

The song "Anaesthetist" is about the privatisation of Britain's National Health Service. On the song, frontman Rou Reynolds stated "We seem to have reached a stage of such capitalistic fervour, that we believe it acceptable to punish people for ill health. By charging for healthcare we act as if illness is nothing but one’s own problem, but what is the purpose and advantage of 'civilisation' if it is not helping the most vulnerable within society? The lottery of birth can offer us a wealth of bad luck when it comes to our health and the safety nets are being pulled in as the desire to boost profit overtakes the desire to help people."

Track listing

Band members
Roughton "Rou" Reynolds – lead vocals, synthesizer, keyboards, programming
Chris Batten – bass guitar, vocals
Liam "Rory" Clewlow – guitar, vocals
Rob Rolfe – drums, percussion, backing vocals

Chart performance

References

Enter Shikari songs
2015 singles
2014 songs
Electronicore songs
Hopeless Records singles
PIAS Recordings singles